"Wake Up" is an indie rock song by Canadian rock band Arcade Fire. It was the fifth and final single released from the band's debut album, Funeral. The single was released as a one-sided 7" vinyl record on November 14, 2005.

Reception
In 2009, NME ranked "Wake Up" as the 25th best song of the 2000s, and in 2014 ranked "Wake Up" as the 25th greatest song of all-time. Rolling Stone ranked "Wake Up" as the 42nd best song of the 2000s.  In October 2011, NME placed it at number 22 on its list "150 Best Tracks of the Past 15 Years".

, "Wake Up" holds the number 61 spot on Rate Your Music's Top Singles of the 2000s.

In popular culture
A live version of the song performed with David Bowie appears on the 2005 Live EP (Live at Fashion Rocks).

This song was played during the beginning of the U2's Vertigo Tour shows, usually followed by "City of Blinding Lights". A brief snippet of the song's pre-concert appearance opens U2's concert film Vertigo 2005: Live from Chicago.

"Wake Up" was played as the pre-game intro song at New York Rangers games during the 2006–2007 season. It is currently used as the intro song for Premier League clubs Burnley and Aston Villa and, since 2005, by Irish Premier League champions Linfield.

A new version of the song was recorded for and featured in the trailer for the 2009 film Where the Wild Things Are.

Arcade Fire licensed "Wake Up" to play in commercials during Super Bowl XLIV. All proceeds from airing the song were donated to Partners in Health for relief efforts related to the 2010 Haiti earthquake.

Track listing
"Wake Up" - 5:33

Personnel
Win Butler - vocals, 12 string electric guitar
Regine Chassagne - vocals, synthesizer
Richard Reed Parry - percussion, accordion, piano, backing vocals, engineer, recording
Tim Kingsbury - electric guitar, backing vocals
Howard Bilerman - engineer, recording
Arlen Thompson - drums
Will Butler - bass, backing vocals
Additional musicians
Sarah Neufeld – violin, string arrangements
Owen Pallett – violin, string arrangements
Michael Olsen – cello
Pietro Amato – horn
Anita Fust – harp
Sophie Trudeau – violin 
Jessica Moss – violin 
Gen Heistek – viola

Charts

Certifications

References

External links
Arcade Fire Online Stores: Wake Up

Arcade Fire songs
2005 singles
2004 songs
2000s ballads
Rock ballads
Rough Trade Records singles
Merge Records singles
Songs written by William Butler (musician)
Songs written by Win Butler
Songs written by Régine Chassagne
Songs written by Tim Kingsbury
Songs written by Richard Reed Parry